John Wentworth (1908–1989) was a British television actor. He starred in the ITV television series The Main Chance in which he played the role of Henry Castleton a traditionalist Leeds-based lawyer.

Selected filmography
Film
 The Last Shot You Hear (1969) - Chambers
 The Oblong Box (1969) - Parson

Television
 The Massingham Affair (1964) - Colonel Deverel
 Angel Pavement (1967) - Mr. Pearson
 The Prisoner (1967) - Sir Charles
 The Main Chance (1969-1975) - Henry Castleton
 Germinal (1970) - Monsieur Gregoire
 The Last of the Mohicans (1971) - Tamenund 
 The Rivals of Sherlock Holmes (1971) - Thaxted
 The Onedin Line (1974-1980) - Dawkins / Mr. Dawkins / Mr. Wallace
 Ripping Yarns (1976) - Chaplain
 Number 10 (1983) - Sir Henry Campbell-Bannerman

References

External links
 

1908 births
1989 deaths
English male film actors
English male television actors